Siege of Falaise may refer to:

Siege of Falaise (1026), the siege of the town by Richard III, Duke of Normandy
Siege of Falaise (1204), the siege and capture of the town by the French during the French annexation of Normandy
Siege of Falaise (1419), the siege and capture of the town by the English during the Hundred Years' War
Siege of Falaise (1450), the siege and capture of the town by the French during the Hundred Years' War